PL/SQL Developer, an Integrated Development Environment for developing software in the Oracle database environment,
focuses on the development of PL/SQL stored-program units. Allround Automations,
based in Enschede in the Netherlands, markets the software.

Plugins 
PL/SQL Developer functionality can be extended with plugins. Documentation and plugin development examples are distributed with the application.

On the application website, plugins developed by Allround Automations and third-party users are available for download.

The third-party rrProject plugin adds its own helpers for writing code and navigating through it, a multifunctional search at the IDE, and other extensions.

History

References

External links 
 PL/SQL Developer Homepage by Allround Automations
 PL/SQL Developer Forum by Allround Automations

Oracle database tools
PL/SQL editors